William Edward Hooker  (August 28, 1880 – July 2, 1929), was a professional baseball player, who played pitcher in the Major Leagues in -. He played for the Cincinnati Reds. He remained active in the minors through 1915, and had a few stints as a player/manager.

External links

1880 births
1929 deaths
Baseball players from Richmond, Virginia
Major League Baseball pitchers
Cincinnati Reds players
Minor league baseball managers
Richmond Blue Birds players
Newport News Shipbuilders players
Richmond Bluebirds players
Concord Marines players
Lowell Tigers players
Providence Grays (minor league) players
Vicksburg Hill Billies players
Lynchburg Shoemakers players
Danville Red Sox players
Johnson City Soldiers players
Hagerstown Blues players